The 1958 United States Senate election in Washington was held on November 4, 1958. Incumbent Democrat Henry M. Jackson won a second term in office over Republican William Bantz.

Blanket primary

Candidates

Democratic
Alice Franklin Bryant
Henry M. Jackson, incumbent United States Senator since 1953

Republican
William B. Bantz

Results

General election

Results

See also 
 1958 United States Senate elections

References

1958
Washington
United States Senate